Everything Will Be Better in the Morning is a 1948 German [comedy [film]] directed by Arthur Maria Rabenalt and starring Ellen Schwanneke, Jakob Tiedtke and Grethe Weiser.

The film's sets were designed by Ernst H. Albrecht.

Cast

See also
Tomorrow It Will Be Better (1939)

References

Bibliography

External links 
 

1948 films
West German films
1948 comedy films
German comedy films
1940s German-language films
Films directed by Arthur Maria Rabenalt
Films based on Austrian novels
Remakes of Dutch films
German black-and-white films
1940s German films